Lower Onslow is a small community in the Canadian province of Nova Scotia, located in Colchester County.

References
Lower Onslow on Destination Nova Scotia

Communities in Colchester County
General Service Areas in Nova Scotia